David Chernushenko (born June 1963) is an author, speaker, sustainability consultant, documentary filmmaker and former politician in Ontario, Canada. He was elected to the Ottawa City Council in the 2010 municipal election and re-elected for a second term in 2014. He was the former deputy leader and senior deputy to the leader of the Green Party of Canada, and a leadership contestant for that party.

Early life and career 

Born in Calgary, Alberta, Chernushenko is a graduate of Queen's University (political science) and alumnus of Cambridge University (international relations), Chernushenko has worked for the Canadian International Development Agency (CIDA), the Canadian Department of Foreign Affairs and International Trade (DFAIT) and the United Nations Environment Programme. He has served on committees and boards of local housing and environment groups, schools and health advisory bodies.

Chernushenko is a "green building" professional accredited by the Leadership in Energy and Environmental Design (LEED) certification program. As owner of the consulting firm Green & Gold Inc. since 1998, he has advised public, private, and non-profit organizations on adopting more sustainable and socially responsible practices.

From 1998 to 2004, Chernushenko served on the International Olympic Committee's commission on Sport and the Environment. He has written several books on sustainable management practices, including Sustainable Sport Management (UNEP, 2001) and Greening Our Games: Running Sports Events & Facilities that Won't Cost the Earth (Centurion, 1994), and the electronic publication Greening Campuses and their Communities (IISD/ACCC/UNEP, 1996). In 2001, he co-founded Clean Air Champions, a national charity that engaged athletes in raising awareness about air pollution, climate change, and the benefits of physical activity in Canada.

Federal politics 

Chernushenko was the Green Party candidate for Ottawa Centre in the 2004 federal election. He finished fourth with 4,730 votes (8%), receiving more votes than any other Green candidate in Ottawa. He ran again in Ottawa Centre in the 2006 federal election and again came fourth, losing to Paul Dewar from the New Democratic Party (NDP). Chernushenko received 6,766 votes (10.2%), the highest vote count of any Green Party candidate in the 2006 election. He passed the 10% threshold, thus becoming eligible for partial government reimbursement of campaign expenditures. Chernushenko was endorsed by the Ottawa Citizen newspaper in the 2004 and 2006 elections. He also ran as the Green Party candidate in Ottawa South in the 2003 Ontario general election.

2006 Green Party leadership bid 
On March 30, 2006, David Chernushenko announced his bid for the leadership of the Green Party of Canada. He was close to the positions of previous leader Jim Harris, in contrast to Elizabeth May, who was seen as more of a traditional activist. Chernushenko received 33.38% of the votes in the election, losing to May. Since that time, Chernushenko has on occasion been critical of May's leadership of the party, and has publicly spoken out about her mixed messages about strategic voting in the 2008 federal election, an issue that some party insiders blamed for the Greens' poorer-than-expected results in that election.

National Round Table on the Environment and the Economy 
On November 10, 2006, Prime Minister Stephen Harper appointed Chernushenko to Canada's National Round Table on the Environment and the Economy (NRTEE), a non-partisan panel that advises the federal government on environmental policy, and works to promote environmental, social and economic practices in Canada's public, private and civil society sectors. Chernushenko served as a member on the NRTEE from 2006 to 2009, and served as vice-chair in 2008–2009.

Chernushenko resigned as deputy leader of the Green Party in July 2007 in order to devote more time to his international consulting business and the NRTEE, and to make documentary films. Since then, he has launched the Living Lightly multimedia project and produced three documentaries, titled Be the Change (2008), Powerful: Energy for Everyone (2010) and Bike City, Great City (2013).

Ottawa City Council 
Chernushenko ran as City Councillor for Capital Ward in the 2010 Ottawa municipal election. He won with 41.34% of the vote. He was re-elected in 2014. In the 2018 municipal election, Chernushenko was defeated by Shawn Menard.

Works

Electoral record

References

External links 
Author website
Councillor's website

Green Party of Canada candidates in the 2004 Canadian federal election
Green Party of Canada candidates in the 2006 Canadian federal election
Living people
1963 births
Canadian people of Ukrainian descent
Queen's University at Kingston alumni
Alumni of the University of Cambridge
Green Party of Ontario candidates in Ontario provincial elections
Politicians from Calgary
Canadian Unitarian Universalists
Ottawa city councillors
Canadian documentary film directors
Canadian documentary film producers
Film directors from Ontario
Film producers from Ontario